(née , born 3 July 1986, Fukui Prefecture) is a Japanese fencer. She competed at the 2012 Summer Olympics in the Women's épée, but was defeated in the second round.

References

Japanese female épée fencers
Living people
Olympic fencers of Japan
Fencers at the 2012 Summer Olympics
Fencers at the 2016 Summer Olympics
Asian Games medalists in fencing
Fencers at the 2010 Asian Games
Asian Games gold medalists for Japan
Asian Games silver medalists for Japan
Medalists at the 2010 Asian Games
Universiade medalists in fencing
Universiade bronze medalists for Japan
Fencers at the 2020 Summer Olympics
1986 births
20th-century Japanese women
21st-century Japanese women